Blackpool Central Mosque and Islamic Community Centre is a Sunni mosque in Blackpool, Lancashire, England.

History
The mosque was originally housed in a  building on Rigby Road, before moving to its own purpose-built building on Revoe Street. In January 2005 the mosque won a heritage award from Blackpool Civic Trust.

The current Imam is Maulana Ashfaq Patel, who is also the Muslim chaplain at Blackpool, Fylde and Wyre hospitals. The mosque is a member of the Blackpool Area Faith Forum.

Facilities
The mosque houses a 500-person-capacity main prayer hall, a daily prayer hall, a ladies prayer room and 7 classrooms.

Blackpool Islamic Community Centre
The Blackpool Islamic Community Centre (BICC) runs classes, seminars and events for Muslims and non-Muslims.

References

External links

 Official website
 Blackpool Central Mosque @ GENUKI

2005 establishments in England
Sunni mosques in England
Mosques completed in 2005
Mosques in Blackpool